Joe Szakos (born March 8, 1954) is a community organizer and author.  He was coordinator of Kentuckians for the Commonwealth (KFTC) from 1981 to 1993, and was the executive director of Virginia Organizing from 1994 to 2017. After stepping down from the directorship, he became the Lynchburg Chapter organizer until his retirement in November 2020.

Early life

Joseph Szakos was born March 8, 1954, in Greensburg, Pennsylvania.  His paternal grandparents were Hungarian immigrants, and his maternal grandparents were Italian immigrants.  He earned a bachelor's degree from Washington and Jefferson College, graduating in 1976 with honors in political science and sociology.  He earned a master's degree from the School of Social Service Administration at the University of Chicago in 1979.

Career as community organizer

Szakos began his work in eastern Kentucky working on housing development in David (Floyd County) in 1979.  He worked as a reporter for the Martin Countian in Inez, Kentucky in 1980-81, and field coordinator for the Appalachian Alliance in 1982.  In December 1982 he became coordinator of the Kentucky Fair Tax Coalition (KFTC), which became Kentuckians For The Commonwealth in 1988.  After ten years with KTFC, Szakos spent a year in 1993-94 as director of a community organizing project in Nagykovácsi, Hungary.  He returned to the U.S. in 1994 to become the founding executive director of the Virginia Organizing Project.  In August 2010 the group shortened its name to Virginia Organizing.

In a 2005 paper Szakos emphasized the need for a collective recruitment plan for community organizers.  He has completed two books on community organizing with his wife, Kristin Layng Szakos.  One book (We Make Change, 2007) is based on 81 interviews with community organizers across the country about what they do and why they do it.  The other (Lessons from the Field, 2008) is a compilation of essays written by experienced rural community organizers, sharing lessons they have learned.

In 2009, Szakos was arrested by his own health insurance company, Anthem Blue Cross, after he tried to ask why his organization's premiums had risen 14%.

Bibliography
Kristin Layng Szakos and Joe Szakos, We Make Change: Community Organizers Talk about What They Do - and Why (Vanderbilt University Press, 2007).  
Joe Szakos and Kristin Layng Szakos, Lessons from the Field: Organizing in Rural Communities (American Institute for Social Justice, 2008).

Notes

External links
Virginia Organizing Project
Kentuckians For The Commonwealth

1954 births
Living people
Washington & Jefferson College alumni
American community activists
People from Kentucky